Christopher Aamon Ruhman (born December 19, 1974) is a former American football offensive tackle in the National Football League. He was drafted by the San Francisco 49ers in the third round of the 1998 NFL Draft and played for the Cleveland Browns in 1999 and 2000. He played college football for the Texas A&M Aggies.

Currently, Christopher A. Ruhman is the Vice President and General Counsel at Southern Title, LLC and earned his Juris Doctor from Valparaiso University College of Law.

References

1974 births
Living people
People from Houston
Players of American football from Texas
American football offensive tackles
Texas A&M Aggies football players
San Francisco 49ers players
Cleveland Browns players